Swannanoa is a census-designated place (CDP) in Buncombe County, North Carolina, United States. The population 5,021 at the 2020 census up from 4,576 at the 2010 census. The community is named for the Swannanoa River, which flows through the settlement. It is part of the Asheville Metropolitan Statistical Area.

History
Swannanoa is located several miles west of Black Mountain just prior to Oteen and eastern Asheville. As the district continues to grow it has three fast food restaurants amongst several local based eateries. With plenty of trails and forest land it is a beautiful mountain area enriched with manufacturing history of the once great Beacon Blanket Mill.
Alexander Inn was listed on the National Register of Historic Places in 1984.

Geography
Swannanoa is located in eastern Buncombe County at  (35.604808, -82.387921), between Asheville and Black Mountain. Interstate 40 passes through the main commercial area of Swannanoa, which is focused around the Ingles supermarket and gas station. The old commercial area sits beside an empty lot where the old Beacon Manufacturing Co. plant once sat. The Beacon Plant was the center of the Swannanoa community, built by the late Charles D. Owen, Sr. It was closed in 2002, and burned almost completely to the ground on September 3, 2003. The local high school is Charles D. Owen High School. Brad Johnson was a graduate of Charles D. Owen High School. He went on to play in the National Football League for the Super Bowl XXXVII Champion Tampa Bay Buccaneers.

Demographics

2020 census

As of the 2020 United States census, there were 5,021 people, 1,614 households, and 837 families residing in the CDP.

2000 census
At the 2000 census, there were 4,132 people, 1,652 households and 1,113 families residing in the CDP. The population density was 649.5 per square mile (250.8/km2). There were 1,774 housing units at an average density of 278.9 per square mile (107.7/km2). The racial makeup was 91.53% White, 5.06% African American, 0.46% Native American, 0.65% Asian, 0.02% Pacific Islander, 1.21% from other races, and 1.06% from two or more races. Hispanic or Latino of any race were 2.52% of the population.

There were 1,652 households, of which 30.0% had children under the age of 18 living with them, 50.1% were married couples living together, 12.2% had a female householder with no husband present, and 32.6% were non-families. 28.6% of all households were made up of individuals, and 11.9% had someone living alone who was 65 years of age or older. The average household size was 2.34 and the average family size was 2.86.

27.9% of the population were under the age of 18, 7.4% from 18 to 24, 28.5% from 25 to 44, 22.5% from 45 to 64, and 13.6% who were 65 years of age or older. The median age was 36 years. For every 100 females, there were 103.1 males. For every 100 females age 18 and over, there were 89.0 males.

The median household income was $31,218 and the median family income was $39,980. Males had a median income of $27,561 and females $22,939. The per capita income was $16,804. About 8.5% of families and 11.4% of the population were below the poverty line, including 17.2% of those under age 18 and 12.3% of those age 65 or over.

Government and infrastructure
The North Carolina Department of Public Safety (formerly the North Carolina Department of Corrections) operates the Swannanoa Correctional Center for Women in Swannanoa. It opened on July 7, 2008, taking women previously at the Black Mountain Correctional Center for Women.

The North Carolina Department of Juvenile Justice and Delinquency Prevention formerly operated the Swannanoa Valley Youth Development Center in Swannanoa for delinquent boys, including those without sufficient English fluency. It opened in 1961.

Originally growing from the Beacon Fire Brigade, Swannanoa receives fire protection from Swannanoa Fire and Rescue who holds a class 2 ISO rating  providing 24/7 Full time coverage out of its main station at 103 South Avenue and out of a substation at 510 Bee Tree Rd providing fire protection, first response and, technical rescue.

Education
Warren Wilson College is located west of the Swannanoa CDP.

Charles D Owen High school provides high school education for grades 9-12  for the Swannanoa and Black Mountain Communities as well as parts of Riceville.

Buncombe Community Schools along with Art Space Charter School are also located in Swannanoa.

References

Census-designated places in Buncombe County, North Carolina
Census-designated places in North Carolina
Asheville metropolitan area